Bruce D. Jones, Ph.D. (born 1969) is an academic, an author and policy analyst. He is Director of the Foreign Policy program and Director of the Project on International Order and Strategy at the Brookings Institution. He is also a consulting professor at the Freeman Spogli Institute at Stanford University and chair of the advisory council of the Center on International Cooperation at New York University.

Through CIC, Jones has authored several policy reports and publications. The Annual Review of Global Peace Operations has rapidly become the reference text for data and analysis on peacekeeping. [From Fragility to Resilience] has provided new international definitions for resilience and statebuilding, which were adopted by OECD member states, and taken forward by the United Kingdom Department for International Development and others. 

Jones's book Power and Responsibility (2009), co-authored by Ambassador Carlos Pascual and Professor Stephen Stedman, received the BookNote Awards Gold Prize in 2009 for Best Book of the Year in the domain of Political Science. Jones is a board member of the Center on Global Counterterrorism Cooperation.

Education
Born in 1969, Jones entered the London School of Economics and Political Science (LSE) in 1991, earning his Ph.D. in 2000 from the Department of International Relations. In 1997–1998, during which time he was registered part-time at LSE, he attended Stanford University as a David Hamburg Fellow on Conflict Prevention at the Stanford University Center for International Security and Cooperation.

Career
Jones joined CIC in 2002 as Deputy Director. From 2004 to 2005, he served as Senior Advisor in the Office of the UN Secretary-General during the UN reform effort leading up to the 2005 World Summit, and in the same period was Acting Secretary of the Secretary-General’s Policy Committee.

Select publications
Books

Articles

References

External links 
 Center on International Cooperation
 Brookings Institution
 Stanford University Center for International Security and Cooperation (CISAC)
 The World Bank: 2011 World Development Report

Living people
1969 births
Center on International Cooperation